Natthanicha Jaisaen (born May 21, 1998 in Chainat) is a Thai indoor volleyball  player. She is a current member of the Thailand women's national volleyball team. She is currently playing for Diamond Food Volleyball Club.

Career
Jaisaen won silver medal with her U23 national team during the 2015 Asian U23 Asian Championship and the bronze medal at the 2016 Asian Cup Championship.

Clubs
  Bureau of Customs (2016)
  Nakornnont (2016–2017)
  King-Bangkok (2017–2018)
  Quint Air Force (2018–2019)
  Diamond Food (2019–2020)
  Nakhon Ratchasima QminC VC (2020-2021)
  Diamond Food (2021–Present)

Awards

Individuals
 2014 PEA Junior Championship "Best Setter"
 2014 Asian Youth Championship "Best Setter"

Clubs
 2016 SVL season –  Runner-Up, with Bureau of Customs Transformers
 2017 Thai-Denmark Super League –  Bronze medal, with 3BB Nakornnont

References

External links
 FIVB Biography

1998 births
Living people
Natthanicha Jaisaen
Natthanicha Jaisaen
Natthanicha Jaisaen